Engineering biology is the set of methods for designing, building, and testing engineered biological systems which have been used to manipulate information, construct materials, process chemicals, produce energy, provide food, and help maintain or enhance human health and environment.

History 
Rapid advances in the ability to genetically modify biological organisms have advanced a new engineering discipline, commonly referred to as synthetic biology. This approach seeks to harness the power of living systems for a variety of manufacturing applications, such as advanced therapeutics, sustainable fuels, chemical feedstocks, and advanced materials. To date, research in synthetic biology has typically relied on trial-and-error approaches, which are costly, laborious, and inefficient.

References

Bibliography 

 H.R.4521 - America COMPETES Act of 2022
https://www.congress.gov/congressional-record/2022/03/17/senate-section/article/S1237-5

 Schuergers, N., Werlang, C., Ajo-Franklin, C., & Boghossian, A. (2017). A Synthetic Biology Approach to Engineering Living Photovoltaics. Energy & Environmental Science. doi:10.1039/C7EE00282C
 Teague, B. P., Guye, P., & Weiss, R. (2016). Synthetic Morphogenesis. Cold Spring Harbor Perspectives in Biology, 8(9), a023929. doi:10.1101/cshperspect.a023929
 Kelley, N. J. (2015). Engineering Biology for Science & Industry : Accelerating Progress. http://nancyjkelley.com/wp-content/uploads/Meeting-Summary.Final_.6.9.15-Formatted.pdf
 H.R.591. - Engineering Biology Research and Development Act of 2015. https://www.congress.gov/bill/114th-congress/house-bill/591
 Kelley, N. J. (2014). The promise and challenge of engineering biology in the United States. Industrial Biotechnology, 10(3), 137–139. doi:10.1089/ind.2014.1516
 ↑ Beal, J., Weiss, R., Densmore, D., Adler, A., Babb, J., Bhatia, S., ... & Loyall, J. (2011, June). TASBE: A tool-chain to accelerate synthetic biological engineering. In Proceedings of the 3rd International Workshop on Bio-Design Automation (pp. 19–21). http://citeseerx.ist.psu.edu/viewdoc/download?doi=10.1.1.467.7189&rep=rep1&type=pdf
 Schrödinger, E. (1946). What is life?: the physical aspect of the living cell. Cambridge.
 Engineering Biology Problems Book. 2016. DOI:10.2139/ssrn.2898429

Biotechnology
Molecular genetics
Systems biology
Bioinformatics
 
Biocybernetics
Appropriate technology
Emerging technologies
Artificial objects